Yandin Wind Farm is one of Western Australia's largest wind power stations, located in Dandaragan, Western Australia.

Construction was completed in late October 2020. The turbines are Vestas V150 variants with a 4.2 MW capacity, resulting in a total generation capacity of 214 MW.

Commissioning began in July 2020  with increasing outputs being exported onto the South West Interconnected System as capacity (turbines) came online. The wind farm opened in May 2021.

Alinta Energy stated "the wind farm would power the equivalent of approximately 200,000 households across Western Australia each year."

Notes

References

Wind farms in Western Australia
2020 establishments in Australia